The Alum Cave Trail (also referred to as Alum Cave Bluff Trail) is an American hiking trail in the Great Smoky Mountains National Park, in Sevier County, Tennessee. The trail ascends Mount Le Conte, the sixth highest mountain east of the Mississippi River, and passes by many notable landmarks, such as Arch Rock, Inspiration Point, the Duckhawk Peaks, and Cliff Top, before merging with Rainbow Falls Trail near the summit.

History
The first recorded account of Alum Cave goes back to 1837 when three farmers, Ephraim Mingus, Robert Collins, and George W. Hayes from the Oconaluftee Indian Village in the Great Smoky Mountains applied at the Sevier County (Tennessee) Land Office for a grant of a  tract of land that would include Alum Cave and its salt deposits.  Tennessee sold the tract of land to the three men on December 6, 1838.  The Epsom Salts Manufacturing Company was formed to mine the deposit.  The materials mined were alum, magnesium sulfate, saltpeter, magnesia, and copperas.  The easily accessible salts were depleted by the mid-1840s, but mining resumed during the Civil War. There is no report on any mining after the Civil War.

Trail synopsis

Due to its short length and scenery (it is often considered Le Conte's most scenic route) it is the most common footpath for hikers seeking to reach the summit of Le Conte.

The entire trail is within Great Smoky Mountains National Park.

Trailhead to Arch Rock

This first leg of the trail leads the hiker through an old-growth forest, consisting largely of hemlock and yellow birch and is relatively easy, as the climb is gradual and the footpath is well-maintained due to its heavy traffic. The first notable landmark comes  into the hike at what is known as Arch Rock, which is a large black slate rock that has, over millennia, come to create, as the name indicates, a large natural arch. Hikers maneuver easily through the cold, moist rock via stairs and steel cables acting as handrails which are placed at numerous points along the footpath.

Arch Rock to Alum Cave Bluff
A hiker who ascends beyond Arch Rock will gradually hear the shift from the powerful company of Alum Cave Creek to the smaller Styx Branch, which accompanies the path for a short distance. Inspiration Point is the next landmark along this less trafficked, though still popular, portion of the trail. Not far from Inspiration Point, the Eye of the Needle (a round, see-through hole cut into the side of Little Duck Hawk Ridge) can be seen to the left as the hiker continues along the now rocky trail. The bluff is the final destination along the trail for many hikers. In winter, massive icicles often form and crash down onto the trail, making the bluff dangerous; in other seasons, the bluff forms a shelter from the frequent rainstorms in these mountains.

Alum Cave Bluff to the LeConte Lodge

Once the hiker reaches this final section of the trail (over half of the path's total distance) most of the company has been left behind, leaving only hikers headed for Le Conte's pinnacle. The first half mile or so beyond the bluffs is the single steepest portion of the hike, and included in this section is Gracie's Pulpit. Named for the matron of the mountain, Gracie McNichol, who famously hiked the trail on her 92nd birthday (among very many other times), the pulpit marks the halfway point of the Alum Cave Bluff Trail. From here the onlooker can get as clear a view as any other along the trail of the four peaks of Le Conte (West Point, Cliff Tops, High Top, and Myrtle Point). After Gracie's Pulpit, the trail is a scenic, peaceful hike through highland Appalachia toward the end of the trail, with many small water crossings and overlooks along the way. Once the  plateau is reached, what once was a beautiful Fraser fir zone, which due to the ravages of the balsam wooly adelgid and acid rain, now is dominated with dead trees. A prolific crop of healthy young Fraser firs grows in the place of the old dead ones in many areas, giving hope for the future of the species. At the terminus the trail merges into the Rainbow Falls Trail is the LeConte Lodge. The lodge provides the only commercial lodging in the national park, as it operates about ten rustic cabins with no electricity or appliances. For many, this signals the end of their journey, but the actual peaks of Le Conte all have separate trails a short distance from the lodge, with Cliff Tops and Myrtle Point each offering expansive panoramas of the mountains and valleys below.

References

External links

Maps and directions

The Alum Cave Trail is shown on the Mount Le Conte 1:24,000-scale topographic map published by the National Park Service:

 Detailed Trail Information With Photos and Short History
 Trail Summary
 Hiking the Alum Cave Trail
 Smoky Mountain landforms
 Alum Cave Trail to Mt Leconte

Great Smoky Mountains National Park
Hiking trails to Mount Le Conte
Protected areas of Sevier County, Tennessee
Rock shelters in the United States